HMS Adventure was a 34-gun fourth-rate of the English Navy, built by Peter Pett II at Woolwich Dockyard and launched in 1646. With the outbreak of the English Civil War she served on the Parliamentary side until 1649. She was incorporated into the Commonwealth Navy in 1650. She partook in the Battle off Dover in 1652, the Battle of Portland and the Battle of Gabbard in 1653. Adventure was employed on Bulstrode Whitelocke's embassy to Sweden, 1653–1654. After the Restoration she was incorporated into the Royal Navy. She was present at the Battle of Lowestoft (1665) and the Battle of Solebay (1672). She also participated in the Golden Horse and Two Lions actions in 1681. She was in the Battle of Barfleur in 1692. She captured several ships in the later part of her career, before being captured by the French in 1709.

Adventure was the second named vessel since it was used for a 26-gun galley, built at Deptford in 1594 and broken up in 1645.

Construction
She was ordered in December 1645 as part of the 1646 Programme. She would be built at Woolwich Dockyard under the guidance of Master Shipwright Peter Pett II. She was launched in 1646.

Her armament varied during her time as a fourth rate. In 1666 she carried 38 guns: ten culverins, fourteen demi-culverins, eighteen 6-pounder  and four sakers. In 1677 her gun armament was 44 guns in wartime and 38 guns in peacetime. Her armament consisted of twenty-two demi-culverins, eighteen 6-pounder guns and four sakers. In 1685 her armament was 40 guns consisting of twelve culverins, six demi-culverins, sixteen 6-pounder guns and six sakers. She was completed at an initial cost of £2,618 or 374 tons at £7 per ton.

Commissioned service

Service in English Civil War
She was commissioned in 1646 under Captain Thomas Beddall partaking in the Winter Guard during 1646/47 and in the spring moved to the Western Guard. Later in 3648 she was under Captain Andrew Ball at the blockade of Kinsale, Ireland. In 1649 she was under Captain Edward Hall then later that year Captain Ball resumed command. She was in the Scilly Islands in the autumn of 1649.

Service with Commonwealth Navy
As part of the Commonwealth Navy, she was with Robert Blake's Fleet at Tagus in 1650, She returned with the Fleet in September/October 1650. At the Battle of Dover she was a member of Rear-Admiral Nehemiah Bourne's Squadron of nine ships on 19 May 1652. This battle is sometimes recorded as the 'Battle of Goodwin Sands'. Later in 1652 she was under the command of Captain Robert Wyard in the North Sea. She was under the command of Captain Robert Nixon at the Battle of Portland. At the Battle off Portland she was a member of Robert Blake's Fleet of eighty-four ships from 18 to 20 February 1653. This British victory secured control over the English Channel. The Dutch lost eight warships and forty merchant vessels. A few months later she was at the Battle of Gabbard as part of Red Squadron, Van Division under the command of Vice-Admiral James Peacock, on 2–3 June 1653. The British were victorious on the first day. When Admiral Tromp attempted to reattack on the 3rd he withdrew when a squadron of eighteen ships arrived under the command of Robert Blake. This fight was followed by the Battle of Scheveningen where she was a member of Red Squadron, Van Division under the command of Vice-Admiral James Peacock on 31 July 1653. Later Captain Peter Foot spent the winter of 1653/54 with the east coast colliers. In 1654 under Captain Robert Sansum followed by Captain John Best in 1655. In 1657 she was under Captain Valentine Tatnell for operations in the Sound followed by the English Channel in June 1660.

Service after the Restoration 1661
On 20 May 1661 she was under the command of Captain Hugh Hide, RN. She sailed to Tangier in 1662. On 7 October 1664 Captain Benjamin Young, RN took command then participated in the Battle of Lowestoffe as a member of Blue Squadron, van Division under the command of Rear-Admiral Thomas Teddiman, on 3 June 1665. As a member of Blue Squadron, Rear Division under the command of Vice-Admiral Sir Edward Spraggw, she was at the Battle of Oxfordness from 25 to 6 July 1666. She captured Le Rubis on 18 September 1666. Later in 1666 Captain Tapley (or Torpley), RN in actions against four French ships on 20 December 1666 and against three Flushing ships 31 December 1666. On 1 January 1671 she was under the command of Captain John Tyrwhitt, RN. She participated in the Battle of Solebay as a member of Red squadron, Center Division under command of HRH James Stuart, Duke of York & Albany, on 28 May 1673. Following this action she was in the Soundings in July 1673. On 7 August Captain John Temple, RN took command. Captain Sir Richard Rooth, RN took command on 22 March 1675 for an expedition against Sale, Morocco. Captain Richard Tapson, RN took command for service in the English Channel. Captain Tapson died on 22 July 1678 with Captain William Booth, RN taking command on 30 July 1678. She destroyed the 32-gun Citron Tree near Tangiers in March/April 1680 then took the 28-gun Calibash on 11 April 1680. In April 1681 she took the 46-gun Golden Horse followed by the destruction of the 34-gun Flower Pot in December 1681. In 1690 she was ordered rebuilt at Chatham as a Fifth Rate.

Rebuild as a Fifth Rate 1691
Adventure was ordered to rebuild at Chatham Dockyard on 7 March 1690 under the guidance of Master Shipwright Robert Lee. She was launched on 20 February 1691. Her armament was changed to 18 (wartime)/ 16 (peacetime) 9-pounder guns on the lower deck (LD), 20 (wartime)/16(peacetime) 6-pounder guns on the upper deck (UD) and initially six (wartime)/four (peacetime) 3 pounder guns on the quarterdeck (QD). The 3-pounders would be replaced with 4-pounders in 1703. The cost of her rebuild £3,293.15.0d or 425 tons @ £7.15.0d per ton with a saving of £350 saved by the old body plus £1,800.5.0d for ground tackle and fitting for a grand total of £4,744.

Commissioned service after rebuild 1691

She was commissioned in 1691 under the command of Captain Thomas Dilkes, RN. She participated in the Battle of Barfleur as a member of Blue squadron, Center Division under the command of Admiral Sir John Ashby, from 19 to 24 May 1692. In concert with Rupert she captured two privateers (one 24-gun and one 18-gun) on the Irish station in October 1692. She captured two 16-gun privateers in the English Channel in December 1692. In 1694 under the command of Captain Charles Cornwall she captured with her squadron the 36-gun La Diligente (under the command of Duguay Trouin) off the Scilly Islands on 12 May 1694. The squadron was in action off Pantelleria on 28 January 1695 capturing the 60-gun Le Content and the 50-gun Le Trident. Later in January 1695 she was under command of Captain John Worrel, RN. In 1696 she was under the command of Captain Charles Richards in the Mediterranean. In 1697 her commander was Captain John Edwards, RN sailing with the Dunkirk squadron. In November 1698 she sailed with Aylmer's squadron to the Mediterranean. In 1701 she was back in the Dunkirk squadron with Captain John Home, RN as commander. In 1703 she was reduced to a 40-gun ship with the removal of her 4-pounder guns. Captain John Balchen took command in February 1703. She was in action with StPol's squadron in the North Sea where the Salisbury was taken on 10 July 1703. In 1705 Captain Edmund Hicks, RN took command. She captured with Tartar the 24-gun Le Jeux in the North Sea on 10 July 1706. In 1707 Captain Robert Clark, RN was in command for service in the Leeward Islands. She was with Admiral Byng's Fleet in the Channel and North Sea. In 1708 she proceeded to the West Indies with a convoy in 1709.

Loss
She was captured by a French squadron off Montserrat, Martinique in the West Indies on 1 March 1709. She suffered about 100 casualties including Captain Clark.

Notes

Citations

References

 A Journal of the Swedish Embassy, in the Years MDCLIII and MDCLIV from the Commonwealth of England, Scotland, and Ireland, Volym 1, T. Becket and P.A. de Hondt, 1772 
Lavery, Brian (2003) The Ship of the Line - Volume 1: The development of the battlefleet 1650-1850. Conway Maritime Press. .
 Winfield, British Warships in the Age of Sail (1603 – 1714), by Rif Winfield, published by Seaforth Publishing, England © 2009, EPUB 
 Fleet Actions
 1.1 Battle off Dover 19 May 1652
 1.5 Battle off Portland (the 'Three Days Battle') 18 - 20 February 1653
 1.7 Battle of the Gabbard (North Foreland) 2 - 3 June 1653
 1.8 Battle of Scheveningen (off Texel) 31 July 1653
 3.1 Battle of Lowestoffe 3 June 1665
 3.4 Battle of Oxfordness ('the St James Day Battle') 25 - 6 July 1666
 5.2 Battle of Solebay (Southwold Bay) 28 May 1672
 6.3 Battle of Barfleur 19 - 22 May 1692
 Chapter 4, The Fourth Rates - 'Small Ships', Vessels acquired from 24 March 1603, 1646 Programme, Adventure
 Chapter 5, Fifth Rates, Fifth Rates of 40-44 guns, Adventure
 Colledge, Ships of the Royal Navy, by J.J. Colledge, revised and updated by Lt Cdr Ben Warlow and Steve Bush, published by Seaforth Publishing, Barnsley, Great Britain, © 2020, EPUB , (EPUB), Section A (Adventure)
 Lavery, The Arming and Fitting ofEnglish Ships of War 1800 - 1815, by Brian Lavery, published by US Naval Institute Press (C) 1989,

External links
 

Ships of the line of the Royal Navy
Ships built in Woolwich
1640s ships